The Philippine Senate Committee on Civil Service, Government Reorganization and Professional Regulation is a standing committee of the Senate of the Philippines.

It was known as the Committee on Civil Service and Government Reorganization until August 3, 2015, when its jurisdiction was expanded.

Jurisdiction 
According to the Rules of the Senate, the committee handles all matters relating to:

 The civil service and the status of officers and employees of the Philippine government including their appointment, discipline and retirement
 Government officers and employees' compensation, privileges, benefits and incentives
 Implementation of the constitutional provisions on the rights of government workers to form and join labor organizations
 Public sector labor-management relations and collective negotiation agreements
 The Civil Service Commission
 The Professional Regulation Commission
 The Government Service Insurance System
 The Social Security System
 Regulation of and admission to and the practice of the professions
 Reorganization of the government or any of its branches or instrumentalities
 All human resource development programs pertaining to the government
 All other matters relating to the Philippine bureaucracy

Members, 18th Congress 
Based on the Rules of the Senate, the Senate Committee on Civil Service, Government Reorganization and Professional Regulation has 7 members.

The President Pro Tempore, the Majority Floor Leader, and the Minority Floor Leader are ex officio members.

Here are the members of the committee in the 18th Congress as of September 24, 2020:

Committee secretary: Mary Jane M. Arzadon

See also 

 List of Philippine Senate committees

References 

Civil